In Greek mythology, Laertes (also spelled Laërtes) was the king of the Cephallenians, an ethnic group who lived both on the Ionian islands and on the mainland, which he presumably inherited from his father Arcesius and grandfather Cephalus. His realm included Ithaca and surrounding islands, and perhaps even the neighboring part of the mainland of other Greek city-states. Laertes was also an Argonaut, and a participant in the hunt for the Calydonian Boar.

Family 
Laertes was the son of Arcesius and Chalcomedusa; and the father of Odysseus (who was thus called Laertiádēs, Λαερτιάδης, "son of Laertes") and Ctimene by his wife Anticlea, daughter of the thief Autolycus. Another account says that Laertes was not Odysseus's true father; rather, it was Sisyphus, who had seduced Anticlea.

Mythology 
Laertes stays away from Odysseus' home while Odysseus is gone. He keeps to himself on his farm, overcome with grief over Odysseus' absence and alone after his wife, Anticleia, died from grief herself. Odysseus finally comes to see Laertes after he has killed all the suitors competing for Penelope. He finds his father spading a plant, looking old and tired and filled with sadness. Odysseus keeps his identity to himself at first, identifying himself only as Quarrelman, only son of King Allwoes (in the Fitzgerald translation of Homer), but when he sees how disappointed Laertes is to learn that this "stranger" has no news of his son, Odysseus reveals himself, and proves his identity by reciting all the trees he received from Laertes when he was a boy. This emphasis on the land of Ithaca itself perhaps signifies that Odysseus has finally reconnected with his homeland, and his journey is over.

Laertes had trained Odysseus in husbandry. After their reunion, the two of them go to Odysseus' home to fend off the families of the dead suitors. Athena infuses vigour into Laertes, so he can help Odysseus. He kills Eupeithes, father of Antinous. Three years after Odysseus' return, Laertes died.

Notes

References 

 Apollodorus, The Library with an English Translation by Sir James George Frazer, F.B.A., F.R.S. in 2 Volumes, Cambridge, MA, Harvard University Press; London, William Heinemann Ltd. 1921. ISBN 0-674-99135-4. Online version at the Perseus Digital Library. Greek text available from the same website.
Dictys Cretensis, from The Trojan War. The Chronicles of Dictys of Crete and Dares the Phrygian translated by Richard McIlwaine Frazer, Jr. (1931-). Indiana University Press. 1966. Online version at the Topos Text Project.
Diodorus Siculus, The Library of History translated by Charles Henry Oldfather. Twelve volumes. Loeb Classical Library. Cambridge, Massachusetts: Harvard University Press; London: William Heinemann, Ltd. 1989. Vol. 3. Books 4.59–8. Online version at Bill Thayer's Web Site
Diodorus Siculus, Bibliotheca Historica. Vol 1-2. Immanel Bekker. Ludwig Dindorf. Friedrich Vogel. in aedibus B. G. Teubneri. Leipzig. 1888-1890. Greek text available at the Perseus Digital Library.
Gaius Julius Hyginus, Fabulae from The Myths of Hyginus translated and edited by Mary Grant. University of Kansas Publications in Humanistic Studies. Online version at the Topos Text Project.
Hesiod, Catalogue of Women from Homeric Hymns, Epic Cycle, Homerica translated by Evelyn-White, H G. Loeb Classical Library Volume 57. London: William Heinemann, 1914. Online version at theio.com
Homer, The Odyssey with an English Translation by A.T. Murray, PH.D. in two volumes. Cambridge, MA., Harvard University Press; London, William Heinemann, Ltd. 1919. . Online version at the Perseus Digital Library. Greek text available from the same website.
 Lucius Mestrius Plutarchus, Moralia with an English Translation by Frank Cole Babbitt. Cambridge, MA. Harvard University Press. London. William Heinemann Ltd. 1936. Online version at the Perseus Digital Library. Greek text available from the same website.
Maurus Servius Honoratus, In Vergilii carmina comentarii. Servii Grammatici qui feruntur in Vergilii carmina commentarii; recensuerunt Georgius Thilo et Hermannus Hagen. Georgius Thilo. Leipzig. B. G. Teubner. 1881. Online version at the Perseus Digital Library.
Publius Ovidius Naso, Metamorphoses translated by Brookes More (1859-1942). Boston, Cornhill Publishing Co. 1922. Online version at the Perseus Digital Library.
Publius Ovidius Naso, Metamorphoses. Hugo Magnus. Gotha (Germany). Friedr. Andr. Perthes. 1892. Latin text available at the Perseus Digital Library.
Suida, Suda Encyclopedia translated by Ross Scaife, David Whitehead, William Hutton, Catharine Roth, Jennifer Benedict, Gregory Hays, Malcolm Heath Sean M. Redmond, Nicholas Fincher, Patrick Rourke, Elizabeth Vandiver, Raphael Finkel, Frederick Williams, Carl Widstrand, Robert Dyer, Joseph L. Rife, Oliver Phillips and many others. Online version at the Topos Text Project.

External links 

Argonauts
Kings in Greek mythology
Characters in the Odyssey

Ithacan characters in Greek mythology
Suicides in Greek mythology